The 2006 America East Conference baseball tournament took place from May 25 through 27 at Centennial Field in Burlington, Vermont. The top four regular season finishers of the league's seven teams qualified for the double-elimination tournament. In the championship game, third-seeded Maine defeated first-seeded Stony Brook, 5-3, to win its fourth tournament championship (its first under head coach Steve Trimper). As a result, Maine received the America East's automatic bid to the 2006 NCAA Tournament.

Seeding 
The top four finishers from the regular season were seeded one through four based on conference winning percentage only. They then played in a double-elimination format. In the first round, the one and four seeds were matched up in one game, while the two and three seeds were matched up in the other.

Results

All-Tournament Team 
The following players were named to the All-Tournament Team.

Most Outstanding Player 
Maine outfielder Mark Ostrander was named Most Outstanding Player.

Notes

References 

America East Conference Baseball Tournament
Tournament
American East Conference baseball tournament
America East Conference baseball tournament
Baseball in Vermont
Sports competitions in Burlington, Vermont
College sports tournaments in Vermont